Bloom syndrome protein is a protein that in humans is encoded by the BLM gene and is not expressed in Bloom syndrome.

The Bloom syndrome gene product is related to the RecQ subset of DExH box-containing DNA helicases and has both DNA-stimulated ATPase and ATP-dependent DNA helicase activities. Mutations causing Bloom syndrome delete or alter helicase motifs and may disable the 3' → 5' helicase activity.  The normal protein may act to suppress inappropriate homologous recombination.

Meiosis

Recombination during meiosis is often initiated by a DNA double-strand break (DSB). During recombination, sections of DNA at the 5' ends of the break are cut away in a process called resection. In the strand invasion step that follows, an overhanging 3' end of the broken DNA molecule then "invades" the DNA of an homologous chromosome that is not broken. After strand invasion, the further sequence of events may follow either of two main pathways leading to a crossover (CO) or a non-crossover (NCO) recombinant (see Genetic recombination and bottom of Figure in this section).

The budding yeast Saccharomyces cerevisiae encodes an ortholog of the Bloom syndrome (BLM) protein that is designated Sgs1 (Small growth suppressor 1).  Sgs1(BLM) is a helicase that functions in homologous recombinational repair of DSBs.  The Sgs1(BLM) helicase appears to be a central regulator of most of the recombination events that occur during S. cerevisiae meiosis.  During normal meiosis Sgs1(BLM) is responsible for directing recombination towards the alternate formation of either early NCOs or Holliday junction joint molecules, the latter being subsequently resolved as COs.

In the plant Arabidopsis thaliana, homologs of the Sgs1(BLM) helicase act as major barriers to meiotic CO formation.  These helicases are thought to displace the invading strand allowing its annealing with the other 3’overhang end of the DSB, leading to NCO recombinant formation by a process called synthesis dependent strand annealing (SDSA) (see Genetic recombination and Figure in this section).  It is estimated that only about 4% of DSBs are repaired by CO recombination.  Sequela-Arnaud et al. suggested that CO numbers are restricted because of the long-term costs of CO recombination, that is, the breaking up of favorable genetic combinations of alleles built up by past natural selection.

Interactions 
Bloom syndrome protein has been shown to interact with:

 ATM,
 CHAF1A,
 CHEK1,
 FANCM,
 FEN1,
 H2AFX,
 MLH1
 P53,
 RAD51L3,
 RAD51,
 RPA1,
 TOP3A,
 TP53BP1,
 WRN,  and
 XRCC2.

References

Further reading

External links 
 GeneReviews/NCBI/NIH/UW entry on Bloom Syndrome
 
 

DNA replication and repair-deficiency disorders